is an underground metro station located in Minato-ku, Nagoya, Aichi, Japan operated by the Nagoya Municipal Subway's Meikō Line. It is located 3.8 kilometers from the terminus of the Meikō Line at Kanayama Station.

History
Tōkai-dōri Station opened on March 29, 1971.

Lines

 (Station number: E4)

Layout
Tōkai-dōri Station has two underground opposed side platforms.

Platforms

There are two sets of automatic ticket gates, the North Gates, beyond which are Exit 1 and Exit 4, and the South Gates, beyond which are Exit 2 and Exit 3.  Each platform has an elevator and an up escalator.  Near Exit 4 is a public telephone.  There are handicapped-accessible bathrooms with a baby changing area inside the North Wicket.  On Platform 1 for Nagoyakō Station, train door 1 is closest to the elevator, and train doors 1 and 18 are closest to the stairs and the escalators.  On the opposite platform, Platform 2 for Kanayama Station, train door 18 is closest to the elevator and escalator, and doors 1 and 18 are closest to the stairs.

References

External links

 Tōkai-dōri Station's web page at the Nagoya Transportation Bureau's web site

Lines
Nagoya Municipal Subway
Meikō Line (Station E04)

Railway stations in Japan opened in 1971
Railway stations in Aichi Prefecture
Stations of Nagoya Municipal Subway